Stewart may refer to:

People
Stewart (name), Scottish surname and given name
Clan Stewart, a Scottish clan
Clan Stewart of Appin, a Scottish clan

Places

Canada
Stewart, British Columbia
Stewart Township, Nipissing District, Ontario (historical)

New Zealand
Stewart Island / Rakiura

United Kingdom
Newton Stewart, Scotland
Portstewart, Northern Ireland
Stewartby, Bedfordshire, England

United States

Airports
Stewart Air Force Base, New York, a former Air Force base and now-joint civil-military airport, shared by:
Stewart Air National Guard Base, New York
Stewart International Airport (also known as Newburgh-Stewart IAP), New York

Counties
Stewart County, Georgia
Stewart County, Tennessee

Localities
Stewart, Alabama
Stewart, Indiana
Stewart, Minnesota
Stewart, Mississippi
Stewart, Missouri
Stewart, Ohio
Stewart, Tennessee
Stewart, Texas
Stewart, West Virginia
Fort Stewart, Georgia
Stewart Manor, New York, a village in the Town of Hempstead, in Nassau County
Stewart Township (disambiguation)
Stewartstown, Pennsylvania

Counties
Stewart County, Georgia
Stewart County, Tennessee

Other Places
Stewart (crater), a lunar impact crater

Brands and enterprises
Stewart's Shops, U.S. chain of convenience stores
W.F. Stewart Company, an American carriage builder

Other uses
R.G. Stewart (shipwreck), a Lake Superior shipwreck off the coast of Wisconsin
Stewart Grand Prix, later known as Jaguar Racing, now known as Red Bull Racing
Stewart's theorem, a geometry theorem
Stewart–Tolman effect, physics

See also
Sewart Air Force Base
Steuart (disambiguation)
Stew (disambiguation)
Steward (disambiguation)
Justice Stewart (disambiguation)
Stuart (disambiguation)